Thet Naing (born 20 December 1992) is a Burmese footballer who plays as a striker or an attacking midfielder for Yadanarbon and the Myanmar national team. He represented Myanmar at the 2013 Southeast Asian Games.

References

1992 births
Living people
Sportspeople from Mandalay
Burmese footballers
Myanmar international footballers
Yadanarbon F.C. players
Association football forwards
Association football midfielders